Shaun the Sheep is a British stop-motion animated television series and a spin-off of the Wallace and Gromit franchise. The title character is Shaun (previously featured as the sheep named "Shaun" in the 1995 short film A Close Shave and the Shopper 13 short film from the 2002 Wallace and Gromit's Cracking Contraptions series). The series focuses on his adventures on a northern English farm as the leader of his flock.

The series first aired in the UK on the CBBC channel on 5 March 2007 and has been broadcast in 180 countries. It consists of 170 seven-minute episodes. The fifth series has 20 episodes and was first aired in the Netherlands from 1 December 2015 to 1 January 2016 and in Australia on ABC Kids from 16 January 2016 to 1 May 2016. In the United States, a series of Shaun the Sheep shorts aired between commercial breaks on Disney Channel starting on 8 July 2007.

The series inspired the spin-off Timmy Time, a show aimed at younger viewers that follows Shaun's small cousin. A feature-length film, Shaun the Sheep Movie, was released theatrically on 6 February 2015. A 30-minute short film, Shaun the Sheep: The Farmer's Llamas, was aired in 2015 as a Christmas TV special. A second feature-length film, A Shaun the Sheep Movie: Farmageddon, was released theatrically on 18 October 2019. A second short film, Shaun the Sheep: The Flight Before Christmas, was released on Netflix on 3 December 2021.

In 2020, the series moved to Netflix for a sixth series, with the subtitle Adventures from Mossy Bottom, however, it returned to CBBC in 2022 to air the sixth season.

Plot 
Shaun, an unusually clever Shropshire sheep, lives with his flock at Mossy Bottom Farm (the name can be seen in nearly all of the opening scenes), a traditional small northern English farm. Each episode centres around Shaun's attempts to add excitement to their otherwise boring lives. The action snowballs into fantastic sitcom-style escapades, most often because they are fascinated with human technology and culture. This usually brings them into partnership — and sometimes conflict — with the sheepdog Bitzer, while they all are simultaneously trying to avoid discovery by the farmer.

Characters

Main 
Shaun is the protagonist of the series and the leader of the flock. He is clever, confident, and prone to mischief, but equally adept at getting himself and/or his friends out of it. As there is no dialogue, like all the sheep, he communicates entirely through bleating and often explains his ideas to the flock by drawing diagrams on a blackboard. He has a good friendship with Bitzer, though this does not stop him from playing pranks on him at times. His vocal effects are performed by Justin Fletcher.
Bitzer is the farmer's long-suffering but loyal sheepdog, dressed for work in a blue knit cap, black collar, knitted wristlet, and large official-looking wrist-watch, carrying a clipboard and walking upright or on all fours as needed. He communicates, canine-fashion, via barks, growls, and the occasional whimper. He also gives instructions to the flock by blowing a whistle. He once bought a bike for himself, and later versions prove this bike to be a BMW 365 duplex. Despite a tendency to be caught listening to music, he takes his job very seriously, to the point of occasionally letting his power go to his head. He is, however, a generally good friend to Shaun and does his best to keep the whole flock out of trouble. His vocal effects are performed by John Sparkes.
Shirley is the largest member of the flock. A gentle giant, she is usually seen placidly eating, though she's intimidating enough to have defended Shaun from Pidsley the cat. She's so big that large objects routinely disappear into her fleece, and she quite often gets stuck herself, needing the other sheep to push, pull, or even sling-shot her out of trouble. However, her size can also come in very handy when what's needed is a battering ram or similarly immovable object. She is a devoted eater, blindly charging towards food, even if it isn't even food in the first place. Her size came from her eating, yet it has been proven that by following a diet and exercising, she can become as thin as Shaun. Her vocal effects are performed by Richard Webber.
Timmy, Shaun's cousin, is the flock's only lamb and thus often the innocent centre of the chaos. Timmy often tries to be like Shaun. His personality is often contrasting: sometimes he acts responsibly and understands what the older sheep say; other times, he acts like a normal baby, sobbing when something is taken from him or scares him. He's a toddler in the series and is often seen sucking a dummy. The spin-off series Timmy Time chronicles his later adventures in preschool. His vocal effects are performed by Justin Fletcher.
Timmy's Mother, Shaun's aunt, wears curlers in her topknot and is a bit careless about maternal duties, even using Timmy once as a makeshift paintbrush. But when her offspring goes astray, she is inconsolable until he is safely back in her care. Her vocal effects are performed by Kate Harbour.
Nuts is quite an eccentric, but useful sheep and usually, like the rest of the flock, accompanies and helps Shaun. But the thing that makes him stand out from the flock is that he has two different-sized eyes and a different-shaped nose. His vocal effects are performed by Andy Nyman.
Hazel is a timid sheep who jumps at the slightest thing and can frequently be heard bleating nervously. When Farmer's caravan rolls off towards the city, Hazel can barely contain her fear – this is the stuff of nightmares! But when she finds herself carried along with the rest of the Flock in hot pursuit of a runaway caravan, Hazel discovers she's much braver than she ever imagined, and that while living in the city might be scary, it's good to face your fears now and again. Her vocal effects are performed by Emma Tate.
The Flock, like typical sheep, tend to follow Shaun and one another, are obedient to orders, and generally form one big happy if sometimes fractious family group. Unlike Shaun, however, they are not particularly bright, which becomes a problem when combined with their ongoing fascination with the human world. It's usually Shaun and Bitzer who sort out the resulting mess. 
The Farmer is a bespectacled, balding man who runs the farm with Bitzer at his side and acts as the flock's primary if unwitting nemesis. His livestock's main concern is to ensure he remains completely oblivious to their unusual sentience, a task made easier by his conventional, unobservant nature but complicated by his enthusiasm for picking up new hobbies. He can be heard frequently making wordless noises, speaking gibberish, or muttering under his breath just audibly enough for the viewer to pick up on his meaning. His disastrous attempts at dating are a running joke of the series. In the 2015 movie, he is referred to as Mr X by those who don't know his identity. In the episode "Karma Farmer", it is revealed that the farmer has a twin. He is voiced by John Sparkes.
The Naughty Pigs, whose pen is adjacent to the sheep field, are bullies to Shaun and his flock, always trying to antagonize them and get them into trouble. They are, however, scared of Bitzer (though they still take the chance to bully him whenever possible). They communicate through oinks and squeals like actual pigs. Their vocal effects are performed by John Sparkes and Justin Fletcher.
Pidsley is the Farmer's orange cat, a minor character (without fur) in Series 1 and the main antagonist of Series 2, who makes his last appearance in "We Wish Ewe A Merry Christmas". In Series 2, he desires to be the sole recipient of the Farmer's attention and thus is jealous of Bitzer. He also dislikes the sheep, thinking of them as stupid and beneath him. He communicates through meows and purrs like an actual cat. His vocal effects are performed by Justin Fletcher.

Other
Mower Mouth is a goat who first appears in the episode of the same name. He is an unstoppable eating machine. While not an unfriendly character, all of his considerable energy is focused on his next meal. He thus routinely causes trouble for Shaun and the flock. His vocal effects are performed by Justin Fletcher.
The Bull is belligerent, powerful and easily provoked by Shaun's antics and the colour red. He first appears in the episode of the same name. His vocal effects are performed by Richard Webber.
The Ducks make frequent appearances. In Series 1, a single duck gets into predicaments due to Shaun's exploits in "Off the Baa!", "Bathtime" and "Tidy Up". Sometimes, he is seen with his lady friends. In Series 2, there are two ducks; in Series 3, they have once again been replaced with a single, pure white duck.
The Aliens appear in "The Visitor", "Shaun Encounters", "Caught Short Alien" and "Cat Got Your Brain" and briefly in "Spring Lamb".  They are green and have one large eye on the top of their head. Despite their advanced scientific technology, which frequently causes trouble for the farm animals, they exhibit human-like behaviour and generally cheerful personalities.
The Granny is a short-tempered, short-sighted old lady, appearing in "Take Away" and "Save the Tree". She also appears in "Two's Company", holding a cart, and "The Big Chase", forcing the pigs to give her a lift in their car. She is renowned for hitting people (or animals) with her handbag when they annoy her by mistake.
The Pizza Delivery Boy is a young man who rides a moped (which Bitzer often "borrows" to chase after the sheep) and works in the local pizzeria. He also works as a postman in "Saturday Night Shaun".
The Farmer's Girlfriend appears for the first time in Series 2. She appears to be adventurous and an animal lover, patting Bitzer and Shaun and offering food to Timmy.
The Farmer's Niece appears in "The Farmer's Niece" (her debut), "Bitzer's New Hat" and "The Rabbit". She appears to be a fan of horses and irritates Shaun, Bitzer, and the flock. The Farmer's Niece is also a spoiled brat, as she screams and wails every time things don't go her way. She is also one of the few humans who know what the flock is up to.

Production 
The show was produced by Aardman Animations and was commissioned by the BBC and the Westdeutscher Rundfunk (WDR), a constituent member of the consortium of German public-broadcasting institutions, ARD. It has aired on BBC channels in the UK since 2007.

Each seven-minute episode is entirely shot in Aardman's distinctive stop-motion animation style. The comedic tone is a combination of slapstick and classic silent comedy, similar to that used in the Wallace & Gromit shorts. Unlike other shows made by Aardman Animations, the series was restricted in its ability to carry much-spoken dialogue, not even from the human characters, except for a few simple grunts, bleats, barks, growls, pointing, sighs, mutterings, and similar wordless inflections, which are used to indicate a character’s mood or motive. Thus, the series also never used any readable words in any episode, although "Bitzer" can be seen on a dog bowl, and—in series four--"Mossy Bottom Farm" on a gate, in the original English-language title sequence. All other signage, such as on a pizza box or a bus stop, is replaced by illegible scrawls and pictures.

Shaun the Sheep's first appearance was in Wallace & Gromit's third short feature, the Academy Award-winning A Close Shave. As the youngest member of a flock of sheep, Wallace and Gromit work to save Shaun from being turned into dog food. He was named Shaun as a pun on the word "shorn" after he was accidentally subjected to Wallace's automated sheep shearing machine. This early version of Shaun shows a hint of his characteristic human-like bravado—among other things, wearing a sweater knitted from his own shorn wool, proving to be a major help in saving the day.

At the end of this short, Shaun is seen living with the duo; Shaun later made a brief cameo appearance in the "Shopper 13" episode of Wallace & Gromit's "Cracking Contraptions" web series. No official explanation has been given for the flock's transfer to the farm.

Although the original series is silent aside from sound effects, a Hindi-dubbed version seen on Nickelodeon India was redone with scripts and dialogue.

The sixth series was commissioned by Netflix.

International dubbing and broadcast
In Albania, it airs on RTSH Fëmijë. In Arabic, this show is broadcast on MBC 3 and Jeem TV. The show's Armenian dub shares the same title, but airs on Shant TV. Azerbaijani language rename this title Quzu Şon, which airs on ARB Günəş. In Afrikaans, it is called Shaun die Skaap, and airs on SABC Children. In the Basque language, it is called Shaun Ardixota, and airs on ETB 3. In the Bermese language, this show airs on Canal + Pu Tu Tue. In Bosnia and Herzegovina, this show is called Ovčica Šoni, and airs on BHT 1. In the Cantonese speaking parts of China, this show airs on TVBV Pearl. In Catala, it is called El Xai Shaun, and primarily airs on Super3. In Croatia, this show is called Janko Strižić, and aired on RTL Play, RTL Kockica, HRT 2, Netflix (which the series was moved to in the sixth series), HBO, HBO 2 and HBO GO. In Czech, it is called Ovečka Shaun, and airs on ČT1, ČT2 and Déčko. In the Danish speaking area, it is called F for Får, and airs on DR1 and DR Ramasjang. In Estonia, this show is called Lammas Shaun, and airs on Nickelodeon, Nick Jr., Ketnet and Zappelen. In Finland, this show is called Late Lammas (Late Lamb), and airs on Yle TV2. In France, it is called Shaun le Mouton, and airs on TF1, France 3, France 5, and Boomerang. The Galician languaged community renames this title O Cordero Shaun (not to be confused with Shaun el Cordero), and airs on tvG2. Germany renamed this title to Shaun das Schaf (which is one of the main titles of the show), and airs on KiKA, ORF and various WDR channels. In Greece, this show airs on Star Channel (not to be confused with the Latin American TV channel formerly called a Latin American version of Fox). In Hebrew, this show airs on Hop! and Kan Educational. In Hungary, this show is called Shaun, a bárány, and airs on Cartoon Network, M2, RTL+ and RTL 2. In Iceland, this show is called Hrúturinn Hreinn.
In Indonesia, it shares the same title as the English title, and the show's theme song ends in a different, child-friendly-like style, and airs on MNCTV, RTV. In Italy, this show is called Shaun, vita da pecora (also known as Shaun la Pecora), and airs on Rai YoYo, Rai Gulp and Rai 2, though the latter dub can currently be watched online on YouTube under the Fun Video channel. In Japan, the shows airs on NHK. In Korea, it airs on EBS. In the Kudish language, it is called Shaunê Kavir, and airs on Zavok TV. Shaune Kavir is spelt with the last letter of the titular character's name, and airs on Niga Kids. In Latvian, it is called Auniņa Šona piedzīvojumi and airs on TV3 and TV6. In the Mandarin language, it airs on CCTV-14. In the Maltese language, dubbed as In-nagħaġ Shaun, it airs on One. In the Norwegian language, it is dubbed as Sauen Shaun In the Persian language, it airs on IRIB Nahal. In Brazil, it is called Shaun, o Carneiro, and airs on TV Cultura and Universal TV. In Portugal, this show is called Ovelha Choné, and aired on RTP2 and, later, Canal Panda. in Romania, this show is called Mielul Shaun and airs on Prima TV. In Russia, it is called Барашек Шон, and airs on 2X2. In Scotland, it is called Seonaidh, and airs on BBC Alba In Serbia, it is called Ovčica Šone, and airs on Prva TV. In the Sinhala language, it airs on Hiru TV. In the Slovak language, it is called Velesá Farma, and airs on RTVS1. In the Slovene language, it is called Basek Jon. In Latin America, it is called Shaun el Cordero, and airs on Pakapaka and Once TV. In Spain, the show is called La Oveja Shaun, and airs on Clan and Canal Panda. In Sweden, this show is named Fåret Shaun, and airs on SVT Barn. In Thailand, this show airs on ThaiPBS. In Turkey, this show is called Koyun Shaun, and airs on MinikaGO. In the Vietnamese language this show airs on Disney Channel before being pulled from the channel's schedule. In the Zaza language, this show is called Shauno Kavir, and airs on Zarok TV. Dutch public television station NTR airs Shaun het Schaap on the kids programma Zappelin

In Canada, the original Canadian iteration of BBC Kids aired the show in syndication with Knowledge Kids. As of January 1, 2019, it exclusively airs on Knowledge Kids.

Episodes 

The first two series consisted of 40 seven-minute episodes each, and the third 20 episodes. The fourth series debuted on 3 February 2014. The fifth series aired on ABC Australia in January 2016. A series of 15 1-minute 3D shorts were released on Nintendo's Video service for the Nintendo 3DS between March and June 2012. The Nintendo shorts were released in early 2016 on the official Shaun the Sheep YouTube channel under the name "Mossy Bottom Farm Shorts". Another series of 21 1-minute sports-themed shorts, named Championsheeps, aired on CBBC during the Summer of 2012.

Television specials
A half-hour television special based on the television series, titled Shaun the Sheep: The Farmer's Llamas, premiered on BBC One on Boxing Day 2015.

A second half-hour special titled Shaun the Sheep: A Winter’s Tale went into production in late 2020 and aired on Christmas 2021 on BBC One. On 23 August, it was revealed to debut on 3 December under the title Shaun the Sheep: The Flight Before Christmas, which later aired on Christmas Eve on BBC One.

In Germany, Shaun the Sheep is a part of "Die Sendung mit der Maus", a famous children's television series of German Television. The creator of Die Sendung mit der Maus also is one of the production companies of Shaun the Sheep.

Netflix and sixth series 
On 19 February 2020, it was reported that the sixth series of Shaun the Sheep, subtitled Adventures from Mossy Bottom, was released on Netflix on 16 March 2020 in Spain, Poland, Turkey, and UAE. Additionally, it was released in the UK, US, Canada, Australia and Latin America on 17 March 2020.

Adventures from Mossy Bottom features a new electronic version of the theme, a new intro episode sequence, and introduced new characters including a super-fast squirrel named Stash, a fancy neighbour Farmer Ben and his dog Lexi, and Rita the delivery lady.

Reception 
Reviews of the series were consistently positive. Harry Venning of The Stage found "characterisation charming and the animation superb. All this before even a mention of how funny and splendidly slapstick the script is." The Guardian noted that the series "hits the four-to-seven-year-old age group smack in the eye." Series producer Gareth Owen said the age range is "four-to-seven, though in reality, the age range is four-to-eighty-seven", as the series is popular among all different age-groups. Charles Arthur wrote "classic Aardman style that leaves me laughing out loud."

Accolades

Spin-off

Timmy Time 

In 2009, Aardman Studios released Timmy Time, a CBeebies spin-off series aimed at preschoolers. It centres on Timmy's own adventures as he attends preschool for the first time and learns how to interact and play with a variety of young animal friends.

Other media

Films

Aardman developed a feature film Shaun the Sheep Movie, written and directed by Richard Starzak and Mark Burton, which was financed by French company StudioCanal, and was released on 6 February 2015. The film received very positive reviews from critics. Review aggregator Rotten Tomatoes reports that 99% of critics have given the film a positive review. The film opened to $3.2 million in the UK and grossed $22 million in the UK and $106 million worldwide.

On 18 October 2019, StudioCanal and Aardman released a sequel titled A Shaun the Sheep Movie: Farmageddon.

Video games

On 16 June 2008, D3 Publisher of America, which had previously published a game based on Aardman's 2006 film Flushed Away, announced that it would also release a video game based on Shaun's escapades. The Shaun the Sheep game was developed by Art Co., Ltd exclusively for Nintendo DS, and was released in autumn 2008.

A second game for Nintendo DS, titled Shaun the Sheep: Off His Head, was released on 23 October 2009, exclusively in Europe.

The Shaun the Sheep website is also home to several Flash-based games, including Home Sheep Home, which was also made available at the iOS App Store for iPhone, iPod Touch, and iPad in April 2011. A sequel, Home Sheep Home 2, was released in December 2011 for Windows PCs, iPhone, iPod Touch, and iPad. It was released on the Steam digital distribution platform for Windows PCs in February 2014.

In June 2016, an event course called Shaun's Mossy Mole Mischief, was released on Super Mario Maker, along with Shaun's costume.

A movie adaptation of Home Sheep Home entitled Home Sheep Home: Farmageddon Party Edition was announced for release in October 2019 for Nintendo Switch. Shaun, Shirley, and Timmy find their way back to the green grass of home. all hosted by Shaun's new alien pal Lu-La. The platform puzzle game will contain all the much-loved gameplay from previous Home Sheep Home games.

, a Shaun the Sheep game was planned for The Sandbox voxel world.

In 2021, Shaun the Sheep was added to RollerCoaster Tycoon Touch.

Theatre
On 9 March 2011, Shaun the Sheep made its live theatre debut in Shaun's Big Show. The 100-minute (1 hour and 40 minute) long musical/dance show features all the regular characters, including Bitzer, Shirley, and Timmy.

In 2015, Shaun starred in Snow White and the Seven Dwarfs pantomime at Bristol Hippodrome.

Promotional
On 26 September 2013, the International Rugby Board and Aardman Animations announced that Shaun and other characters from the franchise would be used in a merchandising programme to promote the 2015 Rugby World Cup to children.

In 2015, Shaun the Sheep appeared as the face of the "Holidays at Home are Great" initiative. In the advert, seeing the Farmer going away, Shaun and the flock decide to have their own holiday around the UK before the Farmer gets back.

In August 2022, The European Space Agency announced that Shaun would fly aboard the Artemis 1 mission which launched on 16 November 2022. and landed on December 11.

Attractions

Shaun in the City

In 2015, Shaun the Sheep starred in two public charity art trails to raise money for sick children in hospitals across the UK. Organised by Wallace & Gromit's Children's Foundation in collaboration with Aardman, Shaun in the City saw 50 giant artists and celebrity-decorated sculptures of Shaun appear in London in the spring before a further 70 appeared in Bristol throughout the summer. All 120 sculptures were auctioned in October 2015, raising £1,087,900 for Wallace & Gromit's Grand Appeal and Wallace & Gromit's Children's Charity.

Shaun the Sheep Land

A Shaun the Sheep ride area, titled Fåret Shaun Land was opened at Skånes Djurpark in Sweden in early Summer 2016.

Shaun the Sheep Experience
In 2015, a family attraction based on Shaun the Sheep, called "The Shaun the Sheep Experience" opened at Lands End, rebranded "Lamb's End" for the duration of the attraction. It features original sets, models, and characters from many Aardman productions. Using green screen technology, guests are able to "star" in a scene from the show, as well as meet other characters from the Aardman filmography including Wallace and Gromit and Morph.

Shaun the Sheep: Championsheeps 
In 2021, Aardman announced the launch of a 30-minute immersive game experience to be located at Electric Gamebox venues in London, Manchester Arndale and Lakeside, Essex.

Home media

DVDs: Region 2 (UK)
DVDs released from 2007 until 2011 were released by 2Entertain. DVDs from 2014 onwards are released by StudioCanal.

DVDs: Region 1 (United States)
DVDs of the series in the United States were released by HIT Entertainment and distributed by Lionsgate Home Entertainment. The last release in the United States, was released by Lionsgate on their own.

 Off the Baa! (11 November 2008): Off The Baa! / Timmy In A Tizzy / Buzz Off Bees / Things That Go Bump / Mower Mouth / Fleeced / Shaun Shoots The Sheep / Mountains Out Of Molehills
 Back in the Ba-a-ath (10 February 2009): Shape Up with Shaun / Bathtime / Fetching / Take Away / Still Life / Scrumping / Stick With Me / The Kite
 Sheep on the Loose (9 June 2009): Sheep on the Loose / Saturday Night Shaun / Tidy Up / Shaun the Farmer / Camping Chaos / If You Can't Stand the Heat
 Little Sheep of Horrors (1 September 2009): Little Sheep of Horrors / Abracadabra / Things That Go Bump / Heavy Metal Shaun / Troublesome Tractor / Sheepwalking
 A Wooly Good Time (16 February 2010): Washday / Tooth Fairy / The Farmer's Niece / Snore-Worn Shaun / Helping Hound / Big Top Timmy
 One Giant Leap for Lambkind (8 June 2010): Shaun Encounters / The Bull / Hiccups / Bitzer Puts His Foot In It / Save The Tree / The Visitor
 Party Animals (7 September 2010): Party Animals / Double Trouble / Hair Today, Gone Tomorrow / Pig Swill Fly / Operation Pidsley / Shaun Goes Potty / Strictly No Dancing
 Shaun the Sheep: Season 1 (19 October 2010, Full Screen; 24 November 2015, widescreen )
 Spring Shena-a-anigans (25 January 2011): Spring Lamb / Supersize Timmy / Bagpipe Buddy / Cheetah Cheater / Lock Out / Draw the Line / Ewe've Been Framed
 The Big Chase (19 April 2011): The Big Chase / Bitzer from the Black Lagoon / Zebra Ducks of the Serengeti / Bitzer's Basic Training / The Magpie / The Boat / Hide and Squeak
 Animal Antics (26 July 2011): Foxy Laddie / Whistleblower / Frantic Romantic / Who's the Caddy / Everything Must Go / In the Doghouse / Cock-a-Doodle Shaun
 We Wish Ewe A Merry Christmas (18 October 2011) We Wish Ewe a Merry Christmas / Snowed In / Fireside Favorite / An Ill Wind / Bitzer's New Hat / Chip Off the Old Block / Shirley Whirley
 Shaun the Sheep: Season 2 (15 November 2011) (widescreen)
 Shear Madness (17 April 2012): Pig Trouble / Sheepless Nights / Party Animals / Cat's Got Your Brain / Two's Company / What's Up, Dog! / Draw the Line
 Shaun the Sheep: Seasons 3 & 4 (7 February 2017) (widescreen)

DVDs: Region 4 (Australia) 
DVDs of the series in Australia are released by ABC DVD and distributed by Roadshow Entertainment.

DVDs: Region 4 (India)

Blu-ray discs

Region A: (Hong Kong, Japan)
Home Media releases are distributed by Panorama Corporation in Hong Kong, and Walt Disney Studios Japan in Japan, with earlier releases under the latter's Ghibli Museum Library imprint.
 Shaun the Sheep – Series 1 (Vol 1 & 2) (Hong Kong)
 Shaun the Sheep – Series 1 (Vol 3 & 4) (Hong Kong)
 Shaun the Sheep – Series 2 (Vol 1 & 2) (Hong Kong)
 Shaun the Sheep – Series 2 (Vol 3 & 4) (Hong Kong)
 Shaun the Sheep – Series 3 (Hong Kong)
 Shaun the Sheep – Season 1, Part 1 (Japan)
 Shaun the Sheep – Season 1, Part 2 (Japan)
 Shaun the Sheep – Season 2, Part 1 (Japan)
 Shaun the Sheep – Season 2, Part 2 (Japan)
 Shaun the Sheep – Season 3 (Japan)
 Shaun the Sheep – Season 4, Part 1 (Japan)
 Shaun the Sheep – Season 4, Part 2 (Japan)
 Shaun the Sheep – Season 5 (Japan)
 Shaun the Sheep – Season 6 (Japan)

Region B (Europe)
 Shaun das Schaf – Special Edition 2 (complete Series 2) (Germany, 25 March 2011) (16:9 widescreen)
 Shaun das Schaf – Special Edition 3 (complete Series 3) (Germany, 5 November 2013) (16:9 widescreen)
 Shaun das Schaf – Special Edition 4 (complete Series 4) (Germany, 5 November 2015) (16:9 widescreen)
 Shaun das Schaf – Die Lamas des Farmers (Germany, 10 March 2016) (16:9 widescreen)
 Shaun das Schaf – Special Edition 5 (complete Series 5) (Germany, 8 March 2018) (16:9 widescreen)

References

External links 
 
Official website
Aardman Animation official website
BBC Press release (animation series)

2000s British children's television series
2000s British animated television series
2010s British children's television series
2010s British animated television series
2020s British children's television series
2007 British television series debuts
Aardman Animations
Animated television characters
Animated television series about dogs
Animated television series without speech
BBC children's television shows
British children's animated comedy television series
British children's animated fantasy television series
British television spin-offs
CBBC shows
Clay animation television series
English-language Netflix original programming
Fictional sheep
Film characters introduced in 1995
Netflix children's programming
Shaun the Sheep
Television series about sheep
Television series by Aardman Animations
Television shows set in England
Television shows set on farms
Wallace and Gromit